Joseph Thys (15 January 1888 – 22 August 1942) was a Belgian footballer. He played in 15 matches for the Belgium national football team from 1912 to 1919.

References

External links
 

1888 births
1942 deaths
Belgian footballers
Belgium international footballers
Place of birth missing
Association football midfielders